Dragon Wings may refer to:

 A line of 1/400 scale model aircraft made by Dragon Models Limited of Hong-Kong, China
 A line of autogyro rotor blades made by Rotor Flight Dynamics of Wimauma, Florida, United States